Oxyeleotris is a genus of sleeper gobies mostly restricted to Australia and New Guinea, though some (O. marmorata, O. siamensis, O. urophthalmoides and O. urophthalmus) are found in Southeast Asia.

They are found in a wide range of fresh and brackish water habitats, and the two species O. caeca and O. colasi are cave-dwellers.

Species
There 17 recognized species in this genus are:
 Oxyeleotris altipinna G. R. Allen & Renyaan, 1996
 Oxyeleotris aruensis (M. C. W. Weber, 1911) (Aru gudgeon)
 Oxyeleotris caeca G. R. Allen, 1996
 Oxyeleotris colasi Pouyaud, Kadarusman, Hadiaty, Slembrouck, Lemauk, Kusumah & Keith, 2013
 Oxyeleotris fimbriata (M. C. W. Weber, 1907) (fimbriate gudgeon)
 Oxyeleotris herwerdenii (M. C. W. Weber, 1910) (blackbanded gauvina)
 Oxyeleotris heterodon (M. C. W. Weber, 1907) (Sentani gudgeon)
 Oxyeleotris lineolata (Steindachner, 1867) (sleepy cod)
 Oxyeleotris marmorata (Bleeker, 1852) (marble goby)
 Oxyeleotris nullipora T. R. Roberts, 1978 (poreless gudgeon)
 Oxyeleotris paucipora T. R. Roberts, 1978 (few-pored gudgeon)
 Oxyeleotris selheimi (W. J. Macleay, 1884) (giant gudgeon)
 Oxyeleotris siamensis (Günther, 1861)
 Oxyeleotris stagnicola G. R. Allen, Hortle & Renyaan, 2000 (Swamp gudgeon)
 Oxyeleotris urophthalmoides (Bleeker, 1853)
 Oxyeleotris urophthalmus (Bleeker, 1851)
 Oxyeleotris wisselensis G. R. Allen & Boeseman, 1982 (Paniai gudgeon)

References

 
Butidae
Taxonomy articles created by Polbot